The athletics competition at the 1971 Pan American Games was held in Estadio Olímpico Pascual Guerrero in Cali, Colombia.  At almost exactly 1000 metres elevation, all the marks from this meet marginally qualify as "altitude assisted."

Medal summary

Men's events

Women's events

Medal table

Participating nations

References
GBR Athletics
Track and Field Brinkster

 
1971
1971 Pan American Games
Pan American
1971 Pan American Games